Wang Nanjun (Chinese: 王南钧), known professionally as Krystian Wang, is a Chinese singer, songwriter, dancer and model. He is best known as a member of the global pop group Now United, representing China, but is currently on hiatus. He was a contestant on Youth With You 3, and participated in the Chinese reality shows Super Boy. he is currently participating in the Korean reality show Boys Planet.

Biography 
Wang was born into a performing arts family in Beijing, China. His father is a military actor, and his mother is a model and theater actress. As a teenager, aged 15, Wang went to study alone in New York.

Career

2017–2021: Super Boy, Now United and Youth With You 3 
In 2017, Wang participated in an edition of the Chinese reality show "Super Boy", where he came 7th place. He performed singing songs like "Gasoline", "Body Electric" and "All Around the World".

On November 17, Wang was revealed as one of the members of Now United, being the twelfth until then. In December of the same year, the group released their first single, "Summer In The City". Among Now United's original songs, Wang's main musical solos are: "How We Do It" featuring Badshah (2018), "Live This Moment" (2020) and
"Chained Up" (2020).

On October 22, 2020, his participation in the 3rd season of the Chinese reality show Youth With You 3 was confirmed.

Wang performed on the reality singing solo songs and in groups with striking choreography and costumes. In February and April 2021, performed on the program for the first time his authorial songs called "Inverse" and "yAo".

On May 9, the official team (iQIYI) of Youth With You 3 confirmed the temporary cancellation of the season days before the final after controversies. With that, no group will be launched. According to the streaming platform, all voting for the contest has ended and the program will “review its rules”. On July 25, 2021, at ChengDu Music Festival the top 9 of Youth With You season 3 were announced as a group called IXFORM. Wang was not part of the group, which means he unfortunately did not make the top 9 on Youth With You season 3.

2022–present: Solo Career and Boys Planet 
On January 10, 2022, Wang released the debut of his solo career with EP eponymous Krystian with two songs, Divo and Lucifer.

On November 28, 2022, his participation in the 2nd season of the Korean reality show Boys Planet was confirmed.

Filmography

Documentaries

Discography

Extended plays 
 Krystian (2022)

Awards and nominations

References

External links 
 
 https://www.iqiyi.com/v_19rrk1teso.html
 

2000 births
Living people
Chinese male dancers
Chinese male singers
XIX Entertainment artists
Now United members
Youth With You contestants
Boys Planet contestants